Charles Kabugo is a senior consultant internal medicine physician in the Uganda Ministry of Health. He is the executive director of Kiruddu General Hospital, in Makindye Division, in southern Kampala, the capital and largest city of Uganda. He was appointed to that position on 9 August 2018.

Background and education
He was born in the Buganda Region of Uganda. After attending local schools, he was admitted to Makerere University to study human medicine, graduating with a Bachelor of Medicine and Bachelor of Surgery (MBChB) degree. Later, Makerere University awarded him a Master of Medicine (MMed) degree in Internal Medicine. He also holds a Master of Science (MSc) in Clinical Epidemiology and Biostatistics, from an undisclosed university.

Career
Dr. Charles Kabugo is a senior consultant physician, who was attached to Mulago National Referral Hospital, Uganda's top and largest tertiary referral hospital, with a 1790 bed capacity, which also serves as the teaching hospital of Makerere University College of Health Sciences.

In May 2016, following the completion of the 200-bed Kiruddu General Hospital, Dr. Kabugo was selected as the interim director of the new facility. More than one hundred in-patients and fourteen out-patient clinics were temporarily transferred to Kiruddu, to make room for renovations to the Lower Mulago Hospital Complex between 2016 and 2019. The fourteen clinics involved included (1) hypertension (2) thyroid (3) diabetes (4) kidneys (5) heart problems (6) infectious diseases (7) skin diseases (8) lung diseases (9) brain diseases (10) burns (11) HIV/AIDS (12) liver diseases (13) rheumatology (joint diseases) and (14) hematology (blood diseases).

In August 2018, Charles Kabugo, MBChB, MMed (Internal Medicine), MSc, was appointed executive director of Kiruddu General Hospital. He will be deputized by Dr. Robert Sentongo.

See also
 Kawempe General Hospital
 Mulago National Referral Hospital
 Makerere University College of Health Sciences

References

External links
Website of Uganda Ministry of Health

Living people
Year of birth missing (living people)
Ganda people
20th-century Ugandan physicians
Makerere University alumni
Academic staff of Makerere University
People from Central Region, Uganda
Ugandan healthcare managers
21st-century Ugandan physicians